Jach'a Waracha (Aymara, jach'a big, waracha wooden camp bed, Hispanicized spelling Jacha Huaracha) is a mountain in the Apolobamba mountain range in Bolivia, about  high. It is situated in the La Paz Department, Franz Tamayo Province, Pelechuco Municipality. Jach'a Waracha lies west of the mountain Waracha and north-west of the mountain Qala Phusa.

See also
 Machu Such'i Qhuchi
 Cololo Lake
 Wanakuni
 List of mountains in the Andes

References 

Mountains of La Paz Department (Bolivia)